The 2010 Ole Miss Rebels football team represented the University of Mississippi during the 2010 NCAA Division I FBS football season. The team was coached by Houston Nutt, who was in his third season as the Rebels' head coach. Ole Miss has been a member of the Southeastern Conference (SEC) since the league's inception in 1932, and has participated in that conference's Western Division since its formation in 1992. The Rebels played seven home games in 2010 at Vaught–Hemingway Stadium in Oxford, Mississippi, which has been Ole Miss football's home since 1915. They finished the season 4–8, 1–7 in SEC play. 

On February 11, 2019, Ole Miss announced the vacation of all wins in the years 2010, 2011, 2012, and 2016. In 2013, all wins except the Music City Bowl were vacated. In 2014, all wins except the Presbyterian game were vacated.

Previous season
The Rebels finished the 2009 season 9–4, 4–4 in SEC play and won their second straight Cotton Bowl Classic 21–7 against Oklahoma State. They finished #20 in the final AP Poll and #21 in the final Coaches Poll.

Preseason notes
Jeremiah Masoli, former Oregon quarterback, walked on to the team months after being dismissed from Oregon.

2010 season
Ole Miss began their 2010 football season with a loss to Jacksonville State. Jacksonville State won 49–48 after a touchdown and successful 2-point conversion in double overtime.

Schedule
Ole Miss started their season against Jacksonville State and then a road game against Tulane. The Rebels hosted SEC opponents Vanderbilt, Kentucky, Auburn and Mississippi State and travelled to Alabama, Arkansas, Tennessee and LSU. The Rebels played host to the Ragin Cajuns of Louisiana Lafayette for their homecoming game on November 6.

Schedule notes
The Rebels' schedule will feature four (3 home, 1 away) non-conference games against BCS non-AQ opponents. Their conference schedule features the other five teams from the SEC West, their Eastern division constant opponent Vanderbilt, and Kentucky and Tennessee. Their Homecoming game will be against the Louisiana–Lafayette Ragin' Cajuns.

Game summaries

The Ole Miss Rebels began their 2010 football season playing FCS opponent Jacksonville State. The Rebels got off to a hot start with Sophomore quarterback Nathan Stanley throwing two long touchdown passes, and would later add a third in the second quarter. A one-yard touchdown run by Enrique Davis gave the Rebels a 31–10 lead at halftime. However, Jacksonville State would score sixteen unanswered points in the second half and tied the game at 34–34 with eighteen seconds left. The Gamecocks converted a two-point conversion on the final play to give them a 49–48 victory. It was the Rebels first loss to an FCS opponent in school history.

Tulane

Coming off a devastating loss in their opener, the Rebels traveled to Tulane to get back on track. They got off to a fast start scoring touchdowns on their first two possessions. A 70-yard touchdown pass from newly named starting quarterback Jeremiah Masoli gave the Rebels a 24–3 lead at halftime. Despite ten unanswered points from the Green Wave, the Rebels won the game 27–13 giving them their first victory of the season. It was their 10th consecutive victory over the Green Wave and gave them a 42–28 series lead.

Vanderbilt

The Rebels hosted the Vanderbilt Commodores in their SEC opener, who had lost 10 straight games within the Southeastern Conference. After a scoreless first quarter, Vanderbilt running back Zac Stacy rushed for a 35-yard touchdown to put the Commodores ahead 7–0. The Rebels would find themselves down 14–0 with under two minutes left in the first half. The Rebels would eventually tie the game at 14–14 with a 28-yard touchdown run by Jeremiah Masoli, but the Commodores responded :12 later with an 80-yard touchdown run by Warren Norman. A Masoli interception with 1:50 remaining would seal the win for Vanderbilt, their second consecutive victory at Vaught–Hemingway Stadium. With the loss, the Rebels fell to 1–2, 0–1 in the SEC.

Fresno State

The Rebels took the field on Family Night against the Fresno State Bulldogs. The Bulldogs got the scoring going early with a 16-yard touchdown pass from Ryan Colburn. The Rebels responded in a big way by scoring 21 consecutive points, and built a 27–10 halftime lead. Brandon Bolden rushed for a 71-yard touchdown right out of the gate in the second half, and the Rebels would not turn back. The Rebels defeated the Bulldogs 55–38 to earn their first victory of the season at Vaught–Hemingway Stadium. Bolden would finish the day with a career-high 228 rushing yards and 3 total touchdowns.

Kentucky

Ole Miss faced the Kentucky Wildcats looking to capture their first winning streak of the season. The Wildcats built an early 14–7 lead, but it was quickly lost with two touchdowns within 2 minutes of each other by the Rebels. Ole Miss captured the momentum in the third quarter with two touchdowns (a pass and run) by Jeremiah Masoli. Despite a comeback attempt by Kentucky, Brandon Bolden ran for 33 yards on third-and-19 to seal the victory. It was the first SEC win for the Rebels and their first winning streak since November 21, 2009. Masoli finished the game with a season-high 4 touchdowns.

Alabama

Coming off their bye-week, the Rebels traveled to Tuscaloosa to take on the Crimson Tide. The Tide were coming off their first loss of the season and had dropped eight spots in the rankings from #1. The Rebels struggled offensively going three-and-out on their first three possessions. Bama's defense held Ole Miss to just 243 yards and 10 points (both season lows). Jeremiah Masoli threw the only offensive touchdown for the Rebels late in the third quarter to Melvin Harris. An interception by Mark Barron in the fourth quarter ended the Rebels' chances as they fell to the defending champions 23–10. Despite the loss, the Rebels defense played their best game of the season as they allowed just 100 rushing yards by Mark Ingram II and Trent Richardson, and sacked Greg McElroy 5 times.

Arkansas

The Rebels traveled to Fayetteville to face the Arkansas Razorbacks in week 8. It was an incredibly slow start for the Rebels as they found themselves trailing 21–0 halfway through the second quarter. Ole Miss got back in the game however with an 18-yard touchdown pass from Jeremiah Masoli. Following a 30-minute lightning delay, Masoli hooked up with Markeith Summers for a 43-yard touchdown pass to cut to Razorback lead 24–17. Knile Davis ran for a 71-yard touchdown two plays later, but Masoli answered with another touchdown pass to Summers to make the score 31–24. Another lightning delay suspended play immediately following the score. Despite a valiant effort to come back, the Rebels' defense could not gather themselves as they gave up a 22-yard touchdown run by Knile Davis to put the game away. With the loss, the Rebels fell below .500 for the third time on the year, and fell to 3–4 for the second time under Houston Nutt. Masoli finished the game with a season-high 327 pass yards and 3 touchdowns.

Auburn

The Rebels took the field on Saturday night against the Auburn Tigers, the #1 ranked team in the BCS. Ole Miss kicked the game off with a punch as Jeff Scott ran 83 yards for a touchdown on the second play of the game. The Tigers quickly responded as Cam Newton caught a 20-yard touchdown pass from Kodi Burns. Auburn took the lead with a 68-yard touchdown run by Onterio McCalebb, but the Rebels tied the game a few minutes later with a 29-yard touchdown pass from Jeremiah Masoli to Markeith Summers. The Rebels were toe-to-toe with the Tigers after one quarter, but things went downhill after that. Auburn went on a 30–3 scoring run entering the fourth quarter. Brandon Bolden scored 2 touchdowns in the fourth quarter, but it was not enough to overcome the Tigers. The Rebels fell 51–31, and found themselves 3–5 on the season (1–4 in SEC play). Jeff Scott ran for a career-high 134 yards and a touchdown.

Louisiana–Lafayette

The Rebels took the field on Homecoming Night against the ULL Ragin' Cajuns. The Cajuns got the scoring going early with a 27-yard touchdown pass, but the Rebels responded with 27 unanswered points. Starting quarterback Jeremiah Masoli had to leave the game with a concussion, and Sophomore Nathan Stanley took over as starter. After two Cajun touchdowns, the Rebels closed the game with 16 consecutive points and earned a 43–21 victory. The victory was the fourth win of the season for the Rebels and brought their record to 4–5. Ole Miss rushed for a season high 298 rushing yards in the win. Brandon Bolden and Enrique Davis both ran for 100 yards, and Bolden finished the game with over 200 total yards and three touchdowns.

Tennessee

References

Ole
Ole Miss Rebels football seasons
Ole Miss Rebels football